The Zambian African National Congress was a political party in Northern Rhodesia dedicated to promoting the rights of black people.

History
The ZANC was formed in October 1958, following a split from the Northern Rhodesian African National Congress led by Harry Nkumbula, which Kaunda regarded as being too moderate. However, it was banned in March the following year and Kaunda imprisoned. upon his release Kaunda joined United National Independence Party in 1960.

In 1964, after Northern Rhodesia achieved independence as Zambia, the Northern Rhodesian African National Congress renamed itself the Zambian African National Congress.

References

Defunct political parties in Zambia
Political parties established in 1958
Political parties disestablished in 1959
1958 establishments in Northern Rhodesia
1959 disestablishments in Northern Rhodesia